Marcella Maria Althaus-Reid (Rosario, Santa Fe, Argentina 11 May 1952 – Edinburgh, Scotland 20 February 2009) was Professor of Contextual Theology at New College, the University of Edinburgh. When appointed, she was the only woman professor of theology at a Scottish University and the first woman professor of theology at New College in its 160-year history.

She was born in Rosario, and graduated with a Bachelor in Theology Degree from ISEDET, the Protestant University Institute in Buenos Aires. She completed her Ph.D. at the University of St Andrews, Scotland. Her interests included liberation theology, feminist theology and queer theology.

Life
Althaus-Reid was born in Rosario, Argentina. She grew up in Buenos Aires, where she graduated with a BA in Theology from the Instituto Superior Evangelico de Estudios Teologicos (ISEDET) ecumenical theological institution in Buenos Aires, oriented toward liberation theology. She studied with liberation theologians including Jose Miguez Bonino and Jose Severino Croatto.

She was a member of the Evangelical Methodist Church of Argentina. She followed the methods of Paulo Freire, undertaking community and social projects supported by the church in impoverished neighborhoods of Buenos Aires. Due to her experience and accomplishments in this regard, Althaus-Reid was invited to Scotland, where she worked in poor neighborhoods of Dundee and Perth, coordinating projects inspired by the liberationist pedagogy of Freire.

She completed her doctorate in 1994 at the University of St Andrews, Scotland, writing her doctoral thesis on the influence of Paul Ricoeur in the methodology of liberation theology. Her academic interests included liberation theology, feminist theology and queer theology. Subsequently, she was appointed Professor of Contextual Theology at New College, University of Edinburgh.

Althaus-Reid died on 20 February 2009, in Edinburgh, Scotland, where she had lived since 1986. At the time of her death she was Director of the International Association for Queer Theology, Director of the Queer Theology Project at the University of Edinburgh, and a member of the Metropolitan Community Church. In the last years of her life, she worked with the Argentine theologian Ivan Petrella to publicize liberation theology in the English-speaking world. She was also associate editor of the journal Studies in World Christianity and a member of the editorial board of the journal Concilium.

Thoughts 
Althaus-Reid is perhaps most well known for her 2002 work in Indecent Theology, in which she challenged feminists in her use of sexual and explicit language. She argued sex has been constructed by a patriarchal worldview which underpins many of the great atrocities of the world. Hence, the virginity of the Virgin Mary needs to be "indecented" as it hides the lives of many poor women who, she describes, as rarely being virgins.

She also speaks about an "indecent Christ," whereby a kenotic Christology speaks of God self-emptying and being embodied in Christ and human sexuality. She explains that "[Jesus] has been dressed theologically as a heterosexually oriented (celibate) man. Jesus with erased genitalia; Jesus minus erotic body." Instead, she speaks about the bi-sexuality of Christ as an inclusive understanding of the incarnation. She wants to argue for a larger Christology which recasts Jesus in postmodern sexualities, genders, and economic locations. This is a critique she had against Latin American liberation theology, which she understood as failing to address questions of gender and sexuality alongside the question of conquest and colonization of the Americas.

Works

See also 
 Feminist theology
 Liberation theology
 Paulo Freire
 Queer theology
 Nadia Bolz-Weber

References

Further reading

External links
 

1952 births
2009 deaths
Academics of the University of Edinburgh
Argentine emigrants to Scotland
Argentine feminists
Argentine Methodists
Argentine people of Swiss-German descent
Argentine theologians
Christian feminist theologians
Argentine LGBT rights activists
LGBT Methodists
Liberation theologians
Methodist theologians
People from Rosario, Santa Fe
Queer theologians
Women Christian theologians
World Christianity scholars